KARATE HOUSE is the seventh full-length album by Japanese band Polysics. "Electric Surfin' Go Go", "You-You-You" and "Catch On Everywhere" were released as singles in Japan. The song "POLYSICS OR DIE!!!!" is structured very similarly to "Jocko Homo" by Devo, who are Polysics' major influence. The song "THE GREAT BRAIN" is a cover of a P-MODEL song, another great influence, from their 1979 debut IN A MODEL ROOM, and the song "POLYSICS OR DIE!!!!" is a reference to their 1999 album Music Industrial Wastes〜P-MODEL OR DIE.

Track listing

References

2007 albums
Polysics albums